Schizolaena masoalensis is a plant in the family Sarcolaenaceae. It is endemic to Madagascar. The specific epithet refers to the Masoala peninsula where the species is found.

Description
Schizolaena masoalensis grows as a liana or tree. Its papery leaves are elliptic to ovate in shape and are coloured grayish green above, tinted orangish below. The inflorescences bear many flowers, each with three sepals and five petals. Fruits are unknown.

Distribution and habitat
Schizolaena masoalensis is known only from the northeastern regions of Sava and Analanjirofo, on the Masoala peninsula. Its habitat is humid forest from sea-level to  altitude. The species is known only from the original specimens, collected in the 1940s. Since then, the location of that collection has become part of Masoala National Park, but more recent specimens have not been found.

References

masoalensis
Endemic flora of Madagascar
Plants described in 1999